Pavalar Varadharajan was a singer, lyric writer, composer, musician, drama writer who mainly did music programs for the Communist Party of India during election campaigns.

Early life
Varadharajan was born in Pannaipuram village (now a town in Theni district of Tamil Nadu) to Ramaswamy and Chinnathayi. His brothers are R.D. Bhaskar, Ilaiyaraaja, and Gangai Amaran.

Political life
He was noticed by the communist leaders for his singing talent. During the 1958 Devikulam by election he campaigned for Rosamma Punnoose belonging to Communist Party of India (CPI) by singing political songs written and composed by himself in and around the tea estates in the constituency. CPI won the election. During the victory meeting, the then chief minister of Kerala, E. M. S. Namboodiripad mentioned that Pavalar Varadharajan was the main reason for the victory in the election. After that he started an orchestra singing political songs for the communist party of India and performed across various cities in India.

The collection of songs written by him was released as book by Ilayaraja.

Death
Due to health problems, Varadharajan was admitted in a hospital in Madurai and died there on 2 December 1973.

Descendants
Varadharajan married Seeniyammal sometime before 1962. The couple had three sons: Pavalar Mainthan (aka "Homo Jov Daniel), Stalin Varadharajan (aka "Ilaya Gangai"; died -c.2006 due to jaundice) and Pavalar Shiva.  Seeniyammal died on 9 April 2020.  Jo, who was working as assistant director, died on 15 July 2020.

Biography
 Padipaligalin paarvaiyil Pavalar Varadharajan (Pavalar Varadharajan in the eyes of creators) by Sangai Velavan.

References 

1930s births
1973 deaths
People from Theni district
Tamil singers
Communist Party of India
Indian Communist poets